Leninsky District is an administrative and municipal district (raion), one of the thirty-six in Moscow Oblast, Russia. It is located in the center of the oblast just south of the federal city of Moscow. Its administrative center is the town of Vidnoye. Population:  145,251 (2002 Census);  The population of Vidnoye accounts for 33.0% of the district's total population.

History
A major part of Leninsky District was merged into the federal city of Moscow on July 1, 2012.

Culture

 St. Catherine's monastery
 Soviet Square and Leninskiy District Historical and Cultural Center (Vidnoye)

Notable residents 

Vasily Molokov (1895–1982), Soviet pilot, a Hero of the Soviet Union, born in Irininskoye village – now called Molokovo
Oleg Vidov (1943–2017), film director, born in either Leninsky District or Vidnoye

References

Notes

Sources

Districts of Moscow Oblast
